Strabomantis laticorpus is a species of frog in the family Strabomantidae. It is found in Panama and possibly Colombia. Its natural habitat is subtropical or tropical moist montane forest.

References

laticorpus
Amphibians of Panama
Endemic fauna of Panama
Taxonomy articles created by Polbot
Amphibians described in 1997